LiViD, short for Linux Video and DVD, was a collection of projects that aim to create program tools and software libraries related to DVD for Linux operating system.

The projects included:
 OMS
 GATOS
 mpeg2dec
 ac3dec

In 2002, LiViD project leader Matthew Pavlovich was sued by the DVD Copy Control Association Inc. (DVD CCA) for trade secret misappropriation because they posted DeCSS on the LiViD website.

See also 
 DeCSS
 AACS encryption key controversy

External links 
Mirrors of the LiViD homepage and the LiViD software
The LiViD website on the Internet Archives Wayback Machine

Linux DVD players